Mike Rockenfeller (born 31 October 1983), nicknamed "Rocky", is a German professional racing driver and was  an Audi factory driver competing in the DTM and the FIA World Endurance Championship. He won his first DTM title in 2013, driving for Audi Sport Team Phoenix. He also won the 2010 24 Hours of Le Mans.

Career
Rockenfeller began racing karts in 1995 at age of 11, winning the Bambini North state championship. He competed in various local and national karting series in the 1990s. In 2002, he won the Jörg van Ommen Kart Cup Super Series.

In 2001, Rockenfeller moved to cars, and finished 4th in the Formula König championship, winning one race. In 2002, he joined the Porsche Junior team and raced in the German Carrera Cup, finishing 10th, and in a partial Porsche Supercup season. In 2003, he finished 2nd in the German Carrera Cup championship, and made his American Le Mans Series debut at Petit Le Mans, finishing 10th in GT2 class. In 2004, Rockenfeller won the German Carrera Cup and also won two races in Porsche Supercup. That year he also raced in the 12 Hours of Sebring, the 1000km of Nürburgring, and Petit Le Mans.

2005 became Rockenfeller's breakthrough year. He became a full Porsche factory driver and won the GT2 class driver championship title in the FIA GT Championship driving with Marc Lieb for GruppeM Racing. He collected 6 class wins, including the Spa 24 Hours. Rockenfeller also won the GT2 class at the 24 Hours of Le Mans, driving with Lieb and Leo Hindrey for Alex Job Racing. 2006 saw him race again in the ALMS and Grand-Am series for Alex Job. He won in the ALMS at Houston and finished second in LMP2 class at Petit Le Mans, driving a Porsche RS Spyder for Penske Racing. He also took two Grand-Am wins.

For 2007, Rockenfeller became an Audi factory driver and raced an A4 DTM for Audi Sport Team Rosberg in the Deutsche Tourenwagen Masters. He also participated in the 24 Hours of Le Mans driving an Audi R10. In addition to DTM and having already moderate experience with Le Mans Prototype cars, in 2008 he drove for Audi Sport Team Joest in the Le Mans Series, alongside Alexandre Prémat. Despite not winning any races, Rockenfeller and Prémat won the title at the 2008 1000 km of Silverstone, after an accident on lap 46 for the Peugeot 908 HDi FAP of Nicolas Minassian and Marc Gené. He also participated in the 24 Hours of Le Mans, occupying the third Audi entry with Prémat and Lucas Luhr. After qualifying fifth, their entry finished in fourth place overall, seven laps down on winning team-mates Rinaldo Capello, Tom Kristensen and Allan McNish.

For 2009, Rockenfeller continues in the DTM with Team Rosberg.

Rockenfeller started the 2010 racing season winning the Rolex 24 At Daytona overall in the Action Express Racing Porsche Riley with co-drivers João Barbosa, Terry Borcheller, and Ryan Dalziel.

In the 2011 24 Hours of Le Mans, Rockenfeller was involved in a horrific accident while passing a slower GTE vehicle at 5:49 into the race. Shortly after nightfall, he was involved in a violent crash at the kinks on the straight between Mulsanne Corner and Indianapolis after near contact with the number 71 car of Robert Kauffman. Rockenfeller then climbed from his car and jumped to safety over the Armco barrier. He sustained a small flesh wound on his right arm and was admitted into a hospital overnight for observation.

Rockenfeller took part in the 2014 Rolex 24 Hours of Daytona race in the Spirit of Daytona Corvette Daytona Prototype with Richard Westbrook and Michael Valiante.

In 2021, it was announced that Rockenfeller would depart from DTM following the season, whilst also parting ways with Audi at the end of the year. He would go on to finish 8th in the points with podiums at Lausitzring, Circuit Zolder, the Nürburgring, and the Hockenheimring driving for Abt Sportsline.

In 2022, Rockenfeller would make two starts in the NASCAR Cup Series for Spire Motorsports in the No. 77 Chevrolet, finishing 30th at Watkins Glen International, and 29th at Charlotte Motor Speedway Roval. In the following year, it was announced that Rockenfeller would join seven-time NASCAR Cup Series champion Jimmie Johnson and 2009 Formula One World Champion Jenson Button to drive the Chevrolet Camaro ZL1 prepared by Hendrick Motorsports for the Garage 56 entry at that years 24 Hours of Le Mans.

Accolades
FIA GT Championship GT2 Champion: 2005
24 Hours Nürburgring overall winner: 2006
24 Hours of Le Mans GT2 winner: 2005
Spa 24 Hours GT2 winner: 2005
24 Hours of Daytona overall winner: 2010
24 Hours of Le Mans overall winner: 2010
Deutsche Tourenwagen Masters Champion: 2013

Racing record

Complete Porsche Supercup results
(key) (Races in bold indicate pole position) (Races in italics indicate fastest lap)

‡ - Not eligible for points.

Complete 24 Hours of Le Mans results

24 Hours of Daytona results

Complete Deutsche Tourenwagen Meisterschaft results
(key)

† Driver did not finish, but was classified as he completed 90% of the winner's race distance.

Complete IMSA SportsCar Championship results
(key)(Races in bold indicate pole position)

* Season still in progress.

Complete FIA World Endurance Championship results
(key) (Races in bold indicate pole position; races in italics indicate fastest lap)

NASCAR
(key) (Bold – Pole position awarded by qualifying time. Italics – Pole position earned by points standings or practice time. * – Most laps led.)

Cup Series

References

External links

 
 
 Fourtitude Magazine profile 

1983 births
Living people
People from Neuwied
Racing drivers from Rhineland-Palatinate
German racing drivers
Deutsche Tourenwagen Masters drivers
24 Hours of Le Mans drivers
24 Hours of Le Mans winning drivers
24 Hours of Daytona drivers
American Le Mans Series drivers
European Le Mans Series drivers
Porsche Supercup drivers
Rolex Sports Car Series drivers
Blancpain Endurance Series drivers
Deutsche Tourenwagen Masters champions
WeatherTech SportsCar Championship drivers
24 Hours of Spa drivers
Porsche Carrera Cup GB drivers
NASCAR drivers
Action Express Racing drivers
Audi Sport drivers
Team Rosberg drivers
Corvette Racing drivers
Abt Sportsline drivers
Team Joest drivers
Phoenix Racing drivers
FIA World Endurance Championship drivers
Porsche Motorsports drivers
Nürburgring 24 Hours drivers
G-Drive Racing drivers
W Racing Team drivers
Team Penske drivers
Porsche Carrera Cup Germany drivers